Gorodetsky or Gorodetski Городецкий (masculine), Gorodetskya Городецкая (feminine), or Gorodetskoye Городецкое (neuter) is a Russian surname which indicates someone who hails from the town of Gorodets. It may also correspond to the Polish language surname Horodecki and Lithuanian language surnames Gorodeckis, Gorodeckas, Horodeckis.

Notable people with the surname include:

Eddie Gorodetsky, television writer and producer
Gabriel Gorodetsky (born 1945), Israeli historian
Olga Gorodetskaya (born 1965), Russian historian of China
Sergey Gorodetsky (1884–1967), Russian poet
Vladimir Gorodetski (born 1937), Russian scientist
Vladimir Gorodetsky, Russian politician
Vladislav Gorodetsky (1863-1930), Polish and Ukrainian architect